Gory Blister is an Italian technical death metal band from Milan, formed in 1991. Their lyrical themes range from psychology to modern literature/poetry and outer space.

History
The band was formed in 1991 and after two demos, "Spoilt By Greed" in 1991 and "Hanging Down the Sounds" in 1993, they released their first EP, Cognitive Sinergy in 1997. In 1999, they self-released, Art Bleeds. By 2004, the line-up consisted of the vocalist Adry Bellant, drummer Joe Laviola, bass guitarist Fredrick and guitarist Raff. In October 2004, the band was requested by AreaDeath Productions to donate their cover version of "1000 Eyes" to a Chinese Death tribute album Unforgotten Past – A Tribute to Chuck Schuldiner. In January 2005, they signed to Mascot Records of Holland. In early 2006, Skymorphosis, was released by Mascot Records and in January 2007, Bellant left the band and was replaced by Clode. In February, they toured with Amoral in Italy. Their third album, Graveyard of Angels, with the vocalist Domenico Roviello,  was released on April 6, 2009, by Mascot Records. After touring Italy to promote the Graveyard album, Gory Blister began writing new songs. Guitarist / vocalist Karl Sanders from U.S. death metal band Nile joined the band to sing as a guest vocalist on two tracks for this fourth album. In April 2012 Gory Blister released via BeckerTeam Records, a division of Scarlet Records, their fourth album titled Earth-Sick, with a new singer named John. The new work contains 10 new songs of pure, and technical, brutal, death metal. The band played several gigs in Italy to promote Earth-Sick as headliner and supporting acts like Entombed, Sinister, Obituary. The band released the fifth album of their metal career; The Fifth Fury in 2014.

Raff Sangiorgio is an Italian heavy metal guitarist, best known for being the co-founder of Gory Blister, for which he released six albums worldwide distributed. Raff Sangiorgio played and shared the stage with some of the main bands in the scene as, Sebastian Back, Virgin Steele, Testament, Nile, Nevermore, Sadus, Darkane, Entombed, Sinister, Obituary, Gorfest, Severe Torture etc. In 2015 Raff Sangiorgio launched a one-man band project focused on instrumental guitar songs, in modern metal-rock style, with bluesy influences. The first album, Rebrith was released in 2016.

Discography

Studio albums

Other releases
Spoilt By Greed (demo, 1991)
Hanging Down the Sounds (demo, 1993)
Cognitive Sinergy (EP, 1997)

Band members
 John St John – vocals
 Raff – guitar
 Fabiano Andreacchio – bass guitar
 Joe Laviola – drums

Former members
 Dome – vocals
 Clode – vocals
 Daniel Botti (Node) – vocals
 Bruce Teah – bass guitar
 Fredrick – bass guitar
 SyM – bass guitar
 Chris – bass guitar
 Adry Bellant (ex-Stygian, Darkness Thy Counts) – vocals

References

External links
 Official website
 Gory Blister at Mascot Records

Italian death metal musical groups
Technical death metal musical groups
Musical groups established in 1991
Italian musical trios
Musical quartets
1991 establishments in Italy
Musical groups from Milan